is an extreme trans-Neptunian object from the outermost region of the Solar System. It was discovered on September 28, 2013 by astronomers at Cerro Tololo Observatory, La Serena.

Orbit and classification 

It orbits the Sun at a distance of 38.1–592.0 AU once every 5591 years and 11 months (2,042,441 days; semi-major axis of 315.04 AU). Its orbit has an eccentricity of 0.88 and an inclination of 7° with respect to the ecliptic.

References

External links 
 Asteroid Lightcurve Database (LCDB), query form (info )
 Dictionary of Minor Planet Names, Google books
 Asteroids and comets rotation curves, CdR – Observatoire de Genève, Raoul Behrend
 Discovery Circumstances: Numbered Minor Planets (1)-(5000) – Minor Planet Center
 
  

Trans-Neptunian objects